Suite Novotel is a chain of 3-star hotels owned by the Accor Group, it is a relatively new fast-growing chain targeting families and businessmen. The rooms cost upwards of €100.

Hotels

France

Île-de-France (including Paris)
Paris CDG Airport Nord 
Paris CDG Airport
Paris Porte de la Chapelle
Paris Porte de Montreuil
Paris Stade Saint Denis
Rueil-Malmaison
Vélizy

Outside Île-de-France

Cannes
Calais
Clermont-Ferrand
Lille-Aéroport
Lille-Europe
Marseille
Montpellier-Antigone
Nancy-Centre
Nice
Perpignan
Reims
Rouen

Germany
Berlin
Hamburg
Hannover
Munich

Other European destinations
Geneva
Luxembourg
Vienna
The Hague
Málaga

Africa
Marrakech

Asia
Dubai
Shanghai

Rooms
The rooms contain a sofa, a large TV with cable and international channels, a large bed with option to roll out a single bed from underneath, a large desk, a microwave, a refrigerator, a bathroom with bath and shower, and a separate toilet. The hotel also has wireless internet access in every room (for a small fee). Rooms come with an unlimited video on demand system.

Communal facilities
Communal facilities include an "ironing room", a gym, a breakfast area, a bar, a computer in reception with internet access as well as a "Boutique Gourmande" (vending machines) providing food and drink at all hours.

External links
 

Novotel